The long and short scales are two of several naming systems for integer powers of ten which use some of the same terms for different magnitudes.

Some languages, particularly in East Asia and South Asia, have large number naming systems that are different from both the long and short scales, such as Chinese, Japanese or Korean numerals, and the Indian numbering system. 

Much of the remainder of the world adopted either the short scale or the long scale for everyday counting powers of ten. Countries with usage of the long scale include most countries in continental Europe and most that are French-speaking, German-speaking, Spanish-speaking and Portuguese-speaking countries (except Brazil). Usage of the short scale is found in most English-speaking countries and most Arabic-speaking countries.

For whole numbers smaller than 1,000,000,000 (109), such as one thousand or one million, the two scales are identical. For larger numbers, starting with 109, the two systems differ. For identical names, the long scale proceeds by powers of one million, whereas the short scale proceeds by powers of  one thousand. For example, in the short scale, "one billion" means one thousand millions (1,000,000,000), whereas in the long scale, it means one million millions (1,000,000,000,000). For interleaved values, the long scale system employs additional terms, typically substituting the word ending -ion for -iard.

To avoid confusion resulting from the coexistence of the two terms, the International System of Units (SI) recommends using the metric prefix to indicate orders of magnitude, associated with physical quantities.

Scales
In both short and long scale naming, names are given each multiplication step for increments of the base-10 exponent of three, i.e. for each integer n in the sequence of multipliers 103n. For certain multipliers, including those for all numbers smaller than 109, both systems use the same names. The differences arise from the assignment of identical names to specific values of n, for numbers starting with 109, for which n=3. In the short scale system, the identical names are for n=3, 4, 5, ..., while the long scale places them at n=4, 6, 8, etc.

Short scale
In the short scale, a billion means a thousand millions (1,000,000,000 which is 109), a trillion means one thousand (short scale) billions (1012), and so on. Thus, a short scale  n-illion equals 103n+3.

Long scale
In the long scale, a  billion means one million millions (1012) and a trillion means one million (long scale) billions (1018), and so on.  Therefore, a long scale n-illion equals 106n. In some languages, the long scale uses additional names for the intermediate multipliers, replacing the ending -ion with -iard; for example, the next multiplier after million is milliard, after a (long scale) billion it is billiard. Hence, a (long scale) n-iard equals 106n+3.

Comparison
The relationship between the numeric values and the corresponding names in the two scales can be described as:

The relationship between the names and the corresponding numeric values in the two scales can be described as:

The root mil in million does not refer to the numeral, 1. The word, million, derives from the Old French, milion, from the earlier Old Italian, milione, an intensification of the Latin word, mille, a thousand. That is, a million is a big thousand, much as a great gross is a dozen gross or 12 × 144 = 1728.

The word milliard, or its translation, is found in many European languages and is used in those languages for 109. However, it is not found in American English, which uses billion, and not used in British English, which preferred to use thousand million before the current usage of billion. The financial term yard, which derives from milliard, is used on financial markets, as, unlike the term billion, it is internationally unambiguous and phonetically distinct from million. Likewise, many long scale countries use the word billiard (or similar) for one thousand long scale billions (i.e., 1015), and the word trilliard (or similar) for one thousand long scale trillions (i.e., 1021), etc.

History
Although this situation has been developing since the 1200s, the first recorded use of the terms short scale and long scale was by the French mathematician Geneviève Guitel in 1975.

The short scale was never widespread before its universal adoption in the United States. It has been taught in American schools since the early 1800s. It has since become common in other English-speaking nations and several other countries. For most of the 19th and 20th centuries, the United Kingdom largely used the long scale, whereas the United States used the short scale, so that the two systems were often referred to as British and American in the English language. After several decades of increasing informal British usage of the short scale, in 1974 the government of the UK adopted it, and it is used for all official purposes. The British usage and American usage are now identical.

The existence of the different scales means that care must be taken when comparing large numbers between languages or countries, or when interpreting old documents in countries where the dominant scale has changed over time. For example, British English, French, and Italian historical documents can refer to either the short or long scale, depending on the date of the document, since each of the three countries has used both systems at various times in its history. Today, the United Kingdom officially uses the short scale, but France and Italy use the long scale.

The pre-1974 former British English word billion, post-1961 current French word billion, post-1994 current Italian word bilione, Spanish billón, German Billion, Dutch biljoen, Danish billion, Swedish biljon, Finnish biljoona, Slovenian bilijon, Polish bilion, and European Portuguese word bilião (with a different spelling to the Brazilian Portuguese variant, but in Brazil referring to short scale) all refer to 1012, being long-scale terms. Therefore, each of these words translates to the American English or post-1974 British English word: trillion (1012 in the short scale), and not billion (109 in the short scale).

On the other hand, the pre-1961 former French word billion, pre-1994 former Italian word bilione, Brazilian Portuguese word bilhão, and Welsh word biliwn all refer to 109, being short scale terms. Each of these words translates to the American English or post-1974 British English word billion (109 in the short scale).

The term billion originally meant 1012 when introduced.
 In long scale countries, milliard was defined to its current value of 109, leaving billion at its original 1012 value and so on for the larger numbers. Some of these countries, but not all, introduced new words billiard, trilliard, etc. as intermediate terms.
 In some short scale countries, milliard was defined to 109 and billion dropped altogether, with trillion redefined down to 1012 and so on for the larger numbers.
 In many short scale countries, milliard was dropped altogether and billion was redefined down to 109, adjusting downwards the value of trillion and all the larger numbers.

Timeline

As large numbers in natural sciences are usually represented by metric prefixes, scientific notation or otherwise, the most commonplace occurrence of large numbers represented by long or short scale terms is in finance. The following table includes some historic examples related to hyper-inflation and other financial incidents.

Timeline

Current usage

Short scale users

English-speaking

Most English-language countries and regions use the short scale with 109 being billion. For example:

 

 (English-speaking)

 (English-speaking)

 (English-speaking)
 (English-speaking) see Using both below

 (formerly Swaziland)

 (English-speaking)

 (English-speaking)
 (English-speaking)
 (English-speaking, trilliún)

 (English-speaking)

 (English-speaking)
 (English-speaking;  billion,  trillion)

 (English speaking) see Using both below

 (English-speaking)

 (English-speaking)
 (English-speaking) 

 (English speaking) see Using both below

 (English-speaking)

 (English-speaking)
 (English-speaking)

 (English-speaking)
 (see also Wales below) 

 (English speaking) see Using both below
 (English-speaking)
 (English-speaking)

Arabic-speaking

Most Arabic-language countries and regions use the short scale with 109 being  , except for a few countries like Saudi Arabia and the UAE which use the word بليون  for 109. For example:

Other short scale

Other countries also use a word similar to trillion to mean 1012, etc. Whilst a few of these countries like English use a word similar to billion to mean 109, most like Arabic have kept a traditionally long scale word similar to milliard for 109. Some examples of short scale use, and the words used for 109 and 1012, are


 (()

 (Brazilian Portuguese:)


 ( or)


 (Hebrew:)
 (Kazakh:)
 (Kyrgyz:)


 (Romanian:)
 (formerly Burma) (Burmese: , ;)
 (Afrikaans speaking) see Using both below
 (Spanish speaking) see Using both below

 (Afrikaans speaking) see Using both below
 (Tajik:)

 (Turkmen: , ; Russian:)

 (Uzbek: , ; Russian:)

Long scale users
The long scale is used by most Continental European countries and by most other countries whose languages derive from Continental Europe (with the notable exceptions of Albania, Greece, Romania, and Brazil). These countries use a word similar to billion to mean 1012. Some use a word similar to milliard to mean 109, while others use a word or phrase equivalent to thousand millions.

Dutch-speaking

Most Dutch-language countries and regions use the long scale with 109 =  , for example:

French-speaking

Most French-language countries and regions use the long scale with 109 = , for example:

 (Canadian French)  see Using both below

 (Côte d'Ivoire)

 

 (French portion of St. Martin Island)

German-speaking

German-language countries and regions use the long scale with 109 = , for example:

Portuguese-speaking

Spanish-speaking

Most Spanish-language countries and regions use the long scale, for example:



 ( or )
 ( or )
 ( or )


 see Using both below
 ( or typ. )

Other long scale

Some examples of long scale use, and the words used for 109 and 1012, are

 ( or typ.)




 Esperanto 

 (Swedish:)

 (or )

 (Persian: میلیارد , بیلیون , تریلیون ) 
 
 (French: , ; German: , ;)
 (French: , ;)
 (English speaking) see Using both below
 (Montenegrin:)
 (Afrikaans speaking) see Using both below

 (Bokmål: , ; Nynorsk:)

. There are ambiguities for numbers above 1012.
 (Italian:)

 (English speaking) see Using both below


 (Afrikaans speaking) see Using both below

 (French: , ; German: , ; Italian: , ; Romansh:)
 (English speaking) see Using both below
 (Italian:)

Using both
Some countries use either the short or long scales, depending on the internal language being used or the context.

Using neither
The following countries use naming systems for large numbers that are not etymologically related to the short and long scales:

By continent 
The long and short scales are both present on most continents, with usage dependent on the language used. Examples include:

Notes on current usage

Short scale

Long scale

Both long and short scale

Neither long nor short scale

Alternative approaches
 In written communications, the simplest solution for moderately large numbers is to write the full amount, for example 1,000,000,000,000 rather than 1 trillion (short scale) or 1 billion (long scale).
 Combinations of the unambiguous word million, for example: 109 = "one thousand million"; 1012 = "one million million".
 Scientific notation (also known as standard form or exponential notation, for example 1, 1, 1, 1, etc.), or its engineering notation variant (for example 1, 10, 100, 1, etc.), or the computing variant E notation (for example 1e9, 1e10, 1e11, 1e12, etc.). This is the most common practice among scientists and mathematicians, and is both unambiguous and convenient.
 SI prefixes in combination with SI units, for example, giga for 109 and tera for 1012 can give gigawatt (=109 W) and terawatt (=1012 W). The International System of Units (SI) is independent of whichever scale is being used. Use with non-SI units (e.g. "giga-dollars", "megabucks") is possible. k€ and M€ is frequently encountered.

See also

 Googol (number)
 Googolplex (number)
 Names of large numbers
 Names of small numbers
 Orders of magnitude (numbers)
 Hindu units of time which displays some similar issues
 Indian numbering system

References

External links
 BBC News article: "Is trillion the new billion?"
 Live-Counter.com: How to visualize large numbers:"

Numerals
Numeral systems